This list is of members of The Harvard Lampoon, a student satirical literary society founded in 1876.

Members
 Frederick Lewis Allen – American historian and editor of Harper's Magazine
 Winthrop Ames – American theater director and producer, playwright and screenwriter
 Kurt Andersen – American novelist
 Michael J. Arlen – American writer
 Henry Beard – cofounder of the National Lampoon
 Robert Benchley – American humorist and film actor
 Andy Borowitz –  American writer, comedian, satirist, and actor
 Carter Burwell – American film composer
 Robert Carlock – American television writer and producer
 Nathaniel Choate – American painter and sculptor who served as vice president of the National Sculpture Society
 Archibald Cary Coolidge – Scholar in international affairs, a planner of the Widener Library, member of the United States Foreign Service
 Ralph Wormeley Curtis – American painter and graphic artist in the Impressionist style
 Greg Daniels – American writer, producer, and director
 Hayes Davenport – American television writer and producer
 Jim Downey – American comedy writer
 Aaron Ehasz – American screenwriter and producer
 Rodman Flender — American movie director
 William Gaddis – American novelist
 Curtis Guild Jr. – American journalist, soldier, diplomat and politician, Governor of Massachusetts
 Fred Gwynne – American actor, artist and author
 Merle Hazard — American satirical country singer and economist
 William Randolph Hearst – American businessman, politician, and newspaper publisher.
 Roger Sherman Hoar – Science fiction author under the nom-de-plume Ralph Milne Farley, senator, and assistant attorney general
 Robert Hoffman – co-founder of National Lampoon
 Charles Hopkinson – American portraitist
 George Howe – American architect and educator
 William R. Huntington – American architect and Quaker representative to the United Nations
 Justin Hurwitz – American television writer and film composer
 Walter Isaacson - American writer and journalist. 
 Colin Jost – American actor, comedian, and screenwriter
 Douglas Kenney – American writer and actor, cofounder of the National Lampoon.
 F. Van Wyck Mason – American historian and novelist 
 John P. Marquand – American writer
 Edward Sandford Martin – first literary editor of Life Magazine
Jeff Martin – American writer, editor-in-chief of The Harvard Lampoon
 James Murdoch – British-born American businessman, the son of media mogul Rupert Murdoch
 B. J. Novak – American actor, screenwriter and producer
 Conan O'Brien – American television host, comedian, writer, and television producer
 Lawrence O'Donnell – American television producer, writer, pundit, and host
 George Plimpton – American journalist, writer, literary editor, actor 
 John Reed – American journalist, poet, and socialist activist, author of Ten Days That Shook the World
 Mike Reiss — American humor writer known for The Simpsons
 Simon Rich – American humorist, novelist, and screenwriter
 Elliot Richardson – American lawyer and politician, United States Attorney General
 Geneva Robertson-Dworet – American screenwriter
 Prince Sadruddin Aga Khan – United Nations High Commissioner for Refugees, 1966–1977
 Thomas Parker Sanborn – American poet, model for the protagonist of Santayana's novel The Last Puritan
 George Santayana – Spanish-American philosopher, essayist, poet, and novelist
 Michael Schur – American television writer and producer
 Robert E. Sherwood –  American playwright, editor, and screenwriter, speechwriter for Franklin Roosevelt
 Alex Shoumatoff  -    American writer 
 Frederic Jesup Stimson – United States ambassador to Argentina
 Ernest Thayer – American writer and poet, writer of "Casey at the Bat"
 John Updike – American novelist, poet, short story writer, art and literary critic
 Jon Vitti — American writer known for The Simpsons
 Harold Weston – American modernist painter
 Edmund March Wheelwright American architect, City Architect of Boston: Lampoons co-founder and architect of the Harvard Lampoon Castle
 John Brooks Wheelwright – American poet, founding member of the Socialist Workers Party in the United States
 Alexis Wilkinson – American writer
 Herbert Eustis Winlock – American Egyptologist
 Alan Yang – American screenwriter, producer and actor
 Steve Young — American television writer

See also 

 :Category:The Harvard Lampoon alumni

References